Oil City may refer to:

Canada
 Oil City (Alberta)
 Oil City, Ontario

United States
Casper, Wyoming, nicknamed "The Oil City"
 Oil City, California, community in Kern County, California
 Oil City, Kentucky, community in Barren County, Kentucky
 Oil City, Louisiana, town in Caddo Parish, Louisiana
 Oil City, Maryland, small community in Caroline County, Maryland
 Oil City, Michigan, small community in Midland County, Michigan
 Oil City, Missouri, community in Chariton County, Missouri
 Oil City, Mississippi, community in Yazoo County, Mississippi
 Oil City, Oklahoma, small community in Carter County, Oklahoma
 Oil City, Stephens County, Oklahoma, community in Stephens County, Oklahoma
 Oil City, Cambria County, Pennsylvania, small community in Cambria County, Pennsylvania
 Oil City, Pennsylvania, city in Venango County, Pennsylvania
 Oil City, Texas, community in Hutchinson County, Texas
 Oil City, Washington, community in Jefferson County, Washington
 Oil City, Wisconsin, small community in Monroe County, Wisconsin